The 1985–86 season of the Moroccan Throne Cup was the 30th edition of the competition.

FAR de Rabat won the cup, beating Difaâ Hassani El Jadidi 3–1 in the final, played at the Prince Moulay Abdellah Stadium in Rabat. FAR de Rabat won the tournament for the fifth time in their history.

Tournament

Last 16

Quarter-finals

Semi-finals

Final 
The final was between the two winning semi-finalists, FAR de Rabat and Difaâ Hassani El Jadidi, on 4 September 1986 at the Prince Moulay Abdellah Stadium in Rabat.

Notes and references 

1985
1985 in association football
1986 in association football
1985–86 in Moroccan football